War in the Balkans or Balkan(s) conflict may refer to:

 Yugoslav Wars, or any of the individual wars, stemming from the breakup of Yugoslavia in the 1990s
 Balkan Wars, the 1912–1913 wars in the Balkans

See also
Bulgarian-Serbian War (disambiguation)